is a Japanese anime television series directed by Takeshi Mori and producted by Gonzo. The series is composed by two seasons consisting of 13 episodes each; Vandread, broadcast from October to December 2002, and Vandread: The Second Stage, broadcast from October 2001 to January 2002. The series was also adapted into a manga and light novel series.

Plot

Set in a universe where humans have colonized the galaxy, and in one star system, men and women are completely segregated (on completely different planets: Mejere by the women, Taraak by the men) causing the gender war to be more than just a metaphor.

Male protagonist Hibiki Tokai, a third-class laborer, takes up a bet to steal a high-tech humanoid robot, known as a Vanguard, from a male attack force battleship about to fight the "evil females". Still on board when the battleship takes off, Hibiki is caught in a battle with female pirates that causes all of the ship's crew to evacuate, except for Hibiki, Duelo McFile, and Bart Garsus. Stuck on board and held as prisoners by female pirates, things seem to have hit an all-time low for Hibiki until the retreating males retaliate by firing torpedoes at the ship to prevent it from falling into women's hands. The Paksis Pragma, the mysterious, living core of the battleship, eradicates the missile, forming a wormhole that sends the pirates and warship to a distant part of the galaxy, fusing the battleship with the female pirates' vessel. The fusion results in a quirky ship with very smooth lines, a host of technical problems, and various hidden capabilities that become apparent later on. The Vanguard Hibiki attempted to steal has also been altered along with three of the women's fighters, known as Dreads, allowing the separate ships to combine. The fusion of Hibiki's mecha with one of the fighters is called a Vandread, the eponymous mecha.

In this alternate, futuristic universe, men and women (at least on Taraak and Mejere) consider each other to be completely separate species (Hibiki gains the nickname "Mr. Alien" from Dita Liebely, the female protagonist), and the three men put up with much abuse at the hands of their female captors, but gradually make their presence accepted: Hibiki as a mecha fighter and technician, Duelo as a skilled doctor and engineer, and Bart as the ship's helmsman and navigator.

The story of the first season revolves around the crew's trip back to the system where their respective home worlds are. Along the way, they encounter strange, robotic machines, both enigmatic and rather Borg-like, though they do not communicate at all. After a few attacks with the unknown enemy, the crew manages to take some alien data samples from a desert planet. The data is read out: "Blood platelets, white blood cells, red blood cells..." Their alien enemies kills human beings and harvests their body parts from them. Not only this, but a later encounter with the flagship of the "Harvesters", the name given to the enemy, reveals that the robots were sent out by the people of Earth, the same planet humans originated from, whose colonists would eventually colonize Mejere, Taraak, and countless other planets.

At the start of the second season, they rescue an escape pod from the Harvesters. The pod contains a girl, Misty Cornwell of Pluto, the last planet in the Earth's solar system to be harvested, and a virus which enters the ship's systems. When the correct password is entered, the virus shuts down and the crew is given access to the hidden data that the pod brings, revealing why the Earthlings are harvesting their own species.

Following the initial drive to colonize, pollution has devastated Earth, making any life on the planet near impossible. Huge metal gears now cover the Earth's stratosphere in an attempt to create a living environment for people in massive structures surrounding the planet. Earthlings, alone and dying on the toxic planet, began to question the humanity of the colonists. Eventually, they convinced themselves that only the inhabitants of Earth are human, and all other humans exists solely to ensure their continued existence. Their solution, therefore, was to send out the Harvester fleet of machines created from the same basic material as the Nirvanas core, the Paksis Pragma. The Harvesters raid and dominate colonies to obtain body parts, allowing the Earthlings to replace their own dying bodies, thus becoming immortal through the lives of others.

Furthermore, it is revealed that the leaders of the original colonists who founded Mejere and Taraak—led by Hibiki's parents, Grandpa and Grandma—were unwilling to lose any future natural-born children to the Harvester Fleets, and so decided upon what they considered to be a most painful but utterly necessary sacrifice: separating the original male and female colonists on two separate planets to create artificially-created twin-races of genetically engineered sons and daughters through the mixed-cloning of the First Generation (the majority of whom still remain secretly secured in cryo-stasis and guarded by the man who raised Hibiki), who would serve as the substitutes to be harvested by Earth, instead of what would have otherwise been the natural-born children of the original colonists.

For the crew, fighting is not just about defeating their enemy and surviving; they need to rush back to their respective home worlds in time to warn their people. But will the leaders of the planets listen to their almost impossible tale?

Broadcast and release

Produced by Gonzo and directed by Takeshi Mori, Vandread was broadcast for 13 episodes on Wowow from October 3 to December 19, 2000. An additional episode, was released on home video on December 21, 2001.

A second season, Vandread: The Second Stage, was broadcast from October 5, 2001, to January 18, 2002. An additional episode, was released on home video on October 25, 2002.

Songs

Opening and ending songs
Trust ("Vandread" opening; also used as the ending in the last "Second Stage" episode) by Salia
Himegoto ("Vandread" ending) by SiLC
Justice ("Second Stage" opening) by Aki Kudou
Yes, Together ("Second Stage" ending) by Yasunori Iwasaki, sung by Aki Kudou
Spacy Spicy Love ("Taidouhen" opening) by Mejare Pirates
Proof ("Turbulance" ending) by Mejare Pirates

Insert songs
What a Wonderful World ("Vandread" insert song) by Donna Burke
Somedays ("Second Stage" insert) by Donna Burke
Ikutose Karuka/Many Many Tears
Good Day Friends (Dita's song) by Yumi Kakazu
Kanojo wa Dandysm (Barnette's song)
Moon Light Lullaby (Meia's song) by Fumiko Orikasa
Slow Down (Jura's song)
Welcome Home (Parfet's song)

Related media
A total of seven light novel volumes, consisting of three Vandread volumes, three Vandread: The Second Stage volumes, and a Vandread: The Extra Stage volume, were released under Kadokawa Shoten's Kadokawa Sneaker Bunko imprint from July 1, 2000, to April 27, 2002.

A manga adaptation, illustrated by Kotetsu Akane, was serialized in Fujimi Shobo's  from the July 2000 to the February 2002 issues. Fujimi Shobo collected its chapters in three tankōbon volumes (including an Extra Stage volume), from January 10, 2001, to March 1, 2002.

References

External links
 Vandread at Funimation
 

2000 Japanese novels
2000 anime television series debuts
2000 manga
2001 anime television series debuts
2002 manga
Action anime and manga
Anime with original screenplays
Comedy anime and manga
Funimation
Geneon USA
Gonzo (company)
Harem anime and manga
Kadokawa Shoten manga
Kadokawa Sneaker Bunko
Light novels
Mecha anime and manga
Shōnen manga
Space opera anime and manga
Wowow original programming